Eagle Point is the area immediately surrounding the intersection of Pennsylvania Route 145 and Pennsylvania Route 329 in Whitehall Township in Lehigh County, Pennsylvania.  It is located between the communities of Egypt and Cementon and is part of the Lehigh Valley metropolitan area in eastern Pennsylvania.

Eagle Point is situated along a small ridge and overlooks Cementon and the more distant city of Allentown and sections of the Lehigh Valley. It uses the Whitehall Zip Code of 18052.

Unincorporated communities in Lehigh County, Pennsylvania
Unincorporated communities in Pennsylvania